Maxwell Records (born June 18, 1997) is an American actor. He is known for his roles as Max in the film Where the Wild Things Are, for which he won the 2009 Young Artist Award for Best Leading Young Actor in a Feature Film, and as Slater Pedulla in The Sitter. He starred in the lead role of John Wayne Cleaver in the 2016 film titled I Am Not A Serial Killer, based on Dan Wells' 2009 novel of the same name, which received positive reviews and ratings. He has also appeared as a guest on The Tonight Show.

Personal life 
Records was born in Portland, Oregon, the son of Shawn Records, a photographer, and Jenny, a librarian.

Records attended Metropolitan Learning Center, a public Kx12 school, for most of his childhood. He then transferred to Trillium Charter School for the rest of High School.

Career 
Records first became famous for the main role in Where the Wild Things Are when he was hired personally by Spike Jonze. Records' father, who is a photographer, was asked to send the company information of actors fitting a certain description; Records happened to fit the criteria, so his information was also provided.

Before being cast in Where the Wild Things Are, Records starred in a music video for the band Death Cab for Cutie.

After Where the Wild Things Are, his most notable roles are Young Stephen in The Brothers Bloom and Slater Pedula in The Sitter.

Records co-starred with Christopher Lloyd as John Wayne Cleaver in the film I Am Not a Serial Killer, shot in 2015 and released in early 2016. Rolling Stone described the role as "a homicidal Midwestern teen who has to kill a mass murderer in order to stop becoming one himself".

Filmography

Film

Video games

Awards

References

External links 
 

Living people
Male actors from Portland, Oregon
American male child actors
American male film actors
1997 births